The Campeonato Nacional de Fútbol de Salón (Spanish for National Futsal Championship) is a futsal Championship held every year in Paraguay. The championship was organized by Federación de Fútbol de Salón del Interior (FEFUSI) from 1965 to 2008, since the XXXIX edition (2009) the tournament is organized by Federación Paraguaya de Fútbol de Salón (FPFS).

List of champions

Titles by teams

See also
Futsal in Paraguay
Paraguay national futsal team
Campeonato de Futsal de Paraguay

External links
 Federación Paraguaya de Fútbol de Salón

References

Futsal competitions in Paraguay
National futsal cups
Futsal